Anatrachyntis sesamivora is a moth in the family Cosmopterigidae. It was described by Edward Meyrick in 1933, and is known from Java, Indonesia.

References

Moths described in 1933
Anatrachyntis
Moths of Indonesia